Jamie Burdekin (born 10 December 1979 in Liverpool) is a British wheelchair tennis player. He competed at the 2008 Summer Paralympics, the 2012 Summer Paralympics and the 2016 Summer Paralympics.

He won the bronze medal together with Peter Norfolk in the Quad Doubles event at the 2008 Summer Paralympics.

Norfolk and Burdekin also won the Quad Doubles event at the Japan Open as part of the 2012 ITF Wheelchair Tennis Tour.

He also won the bronze medal in the  Quad Doubles event at the 2016 Summer Paralympics held in Rio de Janeiro, Brazil, together with Andrew Lapthorne.

In 2014 and 2015, Lapthorne and Burdekin also won the silver medals in the Quad Doubles event of the Wheelchair Tennis Masters.

In 2017, Burdekin was wrongly suspended from competition for four years due to failing to comply with anti-doping testing; as he retired in 2016.

References

External links 
 

1979 births
Living people
Sportspeople from Liverpool
British male tennis players
British wheelchair tennis players
Paralympic wheelchair tennis players of Great Britain
Paralympic medalists in wheelchair tennis
Paralympic bronze medalists for Great Britain
Wheelchair tennis players at the 2008 Summer Paralympics
Wheelchair tennis players at the 2012 Summer Paralympics
Wheelchair tennis players at the 2016 Summer Paralympics
Medalists at the 2008 Summer Paralympics
Medalists at the 2016 Summer Paralympics
Doping cases in tennis
British sportspeople in doping cases
Tennis people from Merseyside
21st-century British people